Antonio Rosl (born 21 March 1944) is a former Argentine footballer.

Playing career
Born in La Plata, Rosl played club football for Club Atlético San Lorenzo de Almagro in Argentina where he was part of the team that famously went unbeaten for the whole of the 1972 Nacional championship.

In 1976, he retires in Gimnasia y Esgrima La Plata.

Titles

References

External links
 
 

1944 births
Living people
Argentine footballers
Argentine people of Polish descent
Argentine people of German descent
Argentine Primera División players
Club de Gimnasia y Esgrima La Plata footballers
San Lorenzo de Almagro footballers
Association football midfielders
Argentina international footballers
Footballers from La Plata